Arthur Praeg (born 1897, date of death unknown) was a South African wrestler. He competed in the men's freestyle middleweight at the 1928 Summer Olympics.

References

External links
 

1897 births
Year of death missing
South African male sport wrestlers
Olympic wrestlers of South Africa
Wrestlers at the 1928 Summer Olympics
Place of birth missing